is a Japanese former baseball pitcher who played in Nippon Professional Baseball (NPB) and Major League Baseball (MLB). Although he was not the first Japanese player in American professional baseball, Nomo is often credited with opening the door for Japanese players in MLB, due to his star status.

In 1995, he won the National League (NL) Rookie of the Year Award and was named an MLB All-Star. He twice led MLB in strikeouts and also threw two no-hitters. He was the only Japanese pitcher in MLB to throw a no-hitter until the Seattle Mariners' Hisashi Iwakuma did so on August 12, 2015, against the Baltimore Orioles.

Nomo was well known for his distinctive "tornado" pitching windup and delivery. In 2014, Nomo was inducted into the Japanese Baseball Hall of Fame. He currently resides in Los Angeles, California.

Early life
Nomo was born in Minato-ku, Osaka, Japan, into the working-class family of Shizuo, a fisherman and postal worker, and Kayoko, a part-time supermarket employee. As a youth, Nomo was shy and withdrawn, although passionate about baseball. He developed his corkscrew-style pitching motion in order to impress his father while playing catch. He believed that rotating from having his back turned to his target would help him add speed to his pitches.

However, he was not selected in the Nippon Professional Baseball draft due to issues with his control. Instead, in 1988, Nomo joined Shin-Nittetsu Sakai, an Industrial League team representing Nippon Steel's branch in Sakai, Osaka. During this time, Nomo slept with a tennis ball taped between his fingers in order to perfect his forkball grip.

Success in Nippon Professional Baseball
Nomo honed his forkball and his control while pitching in the Industrial League. Nomo debuted with them in 1990 and was an immediate success, going 18–8 but more impressively striking out 287 hitters in just 235 innings. The strikeout numbers were attributed to his unorthodox wind-up, where he turned his back to the hitter, raised his pivot leg, and paused for a second before throwing. The delivery increased his pitch speed and made it more difficult for batters to spot the ball coming out of his hand. The windup gave him the nickname "Tornado". Nomo won the Triple Crown that year.

In his first four seasons, Nomo was as consistent, and consistently good, as any pitcher in Japanese baseball, winning 17 or 18 games each year. His fifth season in 1994 was marred by a shoulder injury and netted him only eight wins. Nomo's forkball became famous for being unpredictable for hitters and catchers alike.

Moving to the United States
Nomo had become one of the most popular baseball players in Japan but after the 1994 season, Nomo got into a contract dispute with team management. The Buffaloes rebuffed Nomo's demands to have a contract agent and multi-year contract. Because he was drafted by Kintetsu, the Buffaloes retained exclusive rights to Nomo; however, Nomo's agent, Don Nomura, found a loophole in the Japanese Uniform Players Contract to enable him to become a free agent. The "voluntary retirement clause" allowed a player who retired to play for whomever he wished after returning to active status. This led to him heading to the U.S., where in February 1995, the Los Angeles Dodgers signed him.

Nomo made his U.S. pro baseball debut with the Bakersfield Blaze on April 27, 1995, against the Rancho Cucamonga Quakes. Placed on a 90-pitch limit, and throwing mainly fastballs, Nomo pitched  innings, taking the 2–1 loss against the Quakes. He was also the first Japanese-born player to relocate permanently to the American major leagues, as Murakami played only two seasons with the San Francisco Giants and then returned to the Japanese major leagues for the remainder of his career. The pressure on Nomo would be tremendous, and Japanese media and fans appeared in large numbers in games he started. Nomo's games were regularly broadcast live to Japan, despite the fact most people would be waking up when he started games.

Career in Major League Baseball

1995–1997
The tornado delivery that baffled batters in Japan had the same effect on major league hitters, and he led the league in strikeouts in 1995 (while finishing second in walks) and was second with a 2.54 ERA. He also started that year's All-Star Game, striking out three of the six batters he faced. He topped out at 93 mph in that game. Nomo was named NL Rookie of the Year honors that year over future MVP Chipper Jones. Nomo's no-hitter remains as the only one in Coors Field, and was the last Dodger to throw a no-hitter until Josh Beckett completed one on May 25, 2014.

Nomo also found commercial success in America. Nomo had a signature sneaker, called the Air Max Nomo, produced by Nike in 1996. Also, he appeared on a Segata Sanshiro commercial for the Sega Saturn in 1997.

1998–2000
His performance did not improve and he was released that season. In , he signed with the Chicago Cubs and made three starts for their Triple-A minor league team before refusing to make further starts in the minors, and received a contract with the Milwaukee Brewers, where he went 12–8 with a 4.54 ERA. He reached the 1,000 strikeout mark in 1999, the third fastest in major league history. The Brewers waived him after contract issues and the Philadelphia Phillies claimed him, then granted him free agency only 24 hours later after more contract issues.

2001–2003
Nomo also became just the fourth player in baseball history to have thrown a no-hitter in both leagues (joining Cy Young, Jim Bunning and Nolan Ryan. Randy Johnson would later join them, becoming the fifth player after throwing a perfect game in 2004). It is the earliest, calendar-wise, that a Major League Baseball no-hitter has been pitched. Nomo also led the league in strikeouts for the first time since his first season in MLB.

He ended up having his best season since 1996, posting a 16–6 record, 193 strikeouts, and 3.39 ERA. The following year, he had another strong season, going 16–13 with 177 K and a 3.09 ERA. During September , however, he began to exhibit signs of injury and fatigue.

2004–2008

After undergoing shoulder surgery in October 2003, he was benched after going 4–11 with an 8.25 ERA for the Dodgers (the worst ERA in the history of baseball for a player with at least 15 decisions in a season).

The contract also included a $700,000 incentive that kicked in if Nomo started 20 games. The stipulation was allegedly included because Devil Rays upper management was unsure if Nomo had fully recovered from his injury. After a poor start in which he posted a 7.24 ERA, he was released on July 25. Coincidentally or not, this was two days before he was slated to make his twentieth major league start. On July 27, Nomo was picked up off waivers by the New York Yankees, who signed him to a minor league contract, but never recalled him.

In , Nomo signed on with the Leones del Caracas of the Venezuelan Winter League, managed by his former catcher, Carlos Hernández. His participation in the Venezuelan league was viewed as a first step toward an eventual Major League comeback. He made his debut on October 20, 2007, against Tiburones de La Guaira. Nomo pitched one inning, allowing one hit and no runs.

On January 4, Nomo signed a minor league contract for 2008 with the Kansas City Royals. If added to the roster Nomo would have received a $600,000 one-year contract and the chance to earn $100,000 in performance bonuses. On April 5, his contract was bought by the Royals and was added to the 25-man roster. On April 10, Nomo made his first major league appearance since 2005. He faced the New York Yankees in relief. He was brought in to start the seventh inning of a game while the Yankees were leading 4–1. Nomo loaded the bases, but was able to retire his native countryman, Hideki Matsui, to strand all three runners. However, he later surrendered back-to-back homers to Alex Rodriguez and Jorge Posada in the ninth inning. On April 20, Nomo was designated for assignment. The Royals released him on April 29, 2008. On July 17, 2008, Nomo officially announced his retirement from Major League Baseball.

Post playing career
Prior to the 2016 season, the San Diego Padres hired Nomo as Advisor for Baseball Operations, to assist the club with player development and expand their international profile. David Bednar has stated that he learned his splitter from Nomo.

Playing style
With an overhand delivery, Nomo threw a fastball topping out at 95 mph and a forkball as his primary pitches.

Nomo was known for his signature windup, known as "The Tornado". He began by slowly raising his arms high above his head before lifting his front leg and twisting his torso until his back faced home plate. Then, he hurtled toward the plate with an explosive delivery that featured the same arm speed for all his pitches.

Accomplishments 
Nomo earned 123 wins in the Major Leagues and 78 in Japan, winning his 200th overall game on June 15, 2005. Nomo's success helped inspire other stars from Japan such as Ichiro Suzuki, Hideki Matsui, and Daisuke Matsuzaka to come over to the States as well.

In addition, Nomo is one of only five players that have ever pitched at least one no-hitter game in both the National League and American League in Major League Baseball history. He has, to date, thrown the only no-hitter at Oriole Park at Camden Yards and at Coors Field.

He won the 1996 ESPY Award for Breakthrough Athlete.

Nomo was elected to the Japanese Baseball Hall of Fame in 2014, only the third ever to be selected in their first year of eligibility. At the time, he was also the youngest player ever elected to that Hall of Fame, although his record was broken in 2018 by Hideki Matsui.

In popular culture
A song about Nomo, "There's No One Like Nomo" performed by Jack Sheldon, written by Marvin Hamlisch and Alan and Marilyn Bergman, was released by GNP Crescendo Records (GNPD 1406) in 1996.

Nomo has been referenced in hip-hop lyrics by rappers such as Pusha T and Wale.

Pro wrestler Mitsuhide Hirasawa adopted the ring name Hideo Saito, partially in homage to Nomo.

See also 

 Eiji Sawamura Award
 List of Boston Red Sox no-hitters
 List of Los Angeles Dodgers no-hitters
 List of Major League Baseball annual shutout leaders
 List of Major League Baseball career strikeout leaders
 List of Major League Baseball no-hitters
 List of Major League Baseball players from Japan
 Los Angeles Dodgers award winners and league leaders

References

Further reading 
 Fagen, Herb. Nomo: The Inside Story on Baseball's Hottest Sensation. Friday Harbor, Washington: Turtleback Books, 1996. , .
 Rodman, Edmon J. Nomo: The Tornado Who Took America by Storm. Los Angeles: Lowell House, 1996. .
 Whiting, Robert, "Nomo blazed trail, helped mend fences with move", Japan Times, 3 October 2010, p. 22.
 Whiting, Robert, "Contract loophole opened door for Nomo's jump", Japan Times, 10 October 2010, p. 18.
 Whiting, Robert, "Tireless work ethic earned Nomo respect in majors", Japan Times, 17 October 2010, p. 18.
 Whiting, Robert, "Nomo's legacy should land him in Hall of Fame", Japan Times, 24 October 2010, p. 22.

External links
, or Retrosheet
 
 Nomo Baseball club

1968 births
American League strikeout champions
Bakersfield Blaze players
Baseball players at the 1988 Summer Olympics
Boston Red Sox players
Charlotte Knights players
Columbus Clippers players
Detroit Tigers players
Huntsville Stars players
Iowa Cubs players
Japanese Baseball Hall of Fame inductees
Japanese expatriate baseball players in the United States
Kansas City Royals players
Kintetsu Buffaloes players
Las Vegas 51s players
Leones del Caracas players
Japanese expatriate baseball players in Venezuela
Living people
Los Angeles Dodgers players
Major League Baseball pitchers
Major League Baseball players from Japan
Major League Baseball Rookie of the Year Award winners
Milwaukee Brewers players
National League All-Stars
National League strikeout champions
New York Mets players
Nippon Professional Baseball MVP Award winners
Nippon Professional Baseball pitchers
Nippon Professional Baseball Rookie of the Year Award winners
Olympic baseball players of Japan
Olympic silver medalists for Japan
Baseball people from Osaka
Tampa Bay Devil Rays players
Medalists at the 1988 Summer Olympics
Olympic medalists in baseball